The Equals are an English rock band. They are best remembered for their million-selling chart-topper "Baby, Come Back", though they had several other chart hits in the UK and Europe. Drummer John Hall founded the group with brothers Derv and Lincoln Gordon, Pat Lloyd, and Eddy Grant and they were noted as being "the first major interracial rock group in the UK" and "one of the few racially mixed bands of the era".

History

Early career

The group's members met on a Hornsey Rise council estate, where Grant, Lloyd and Hall were school friends at Acland Burghley. In late 1964, Hall suggested that they form a band. John Hall (drums), Eddy Grant (lead guitar), Pat Lloyd (rhythm guitar), Derv Gordon (vocals) and Lincoln Gordon (rhythm guitar) became The Equals. The three-guitar lineup continued until 1969, when Lincoln Gordon switched from rhythm guitar to bass.

At first The Equals performed in London, and gained a following "with their apparently limitless energy and a distinct style fusing pop, blues, and R&B plus elements of ska and bluebeat." They often opened the bill at shows by visiting American R&B and soul artists such as Bo Diddley, Solomon Burke and Wilson Pickett. A neighbour of Grant's, singer Gene Latter, put them in touch with President Records, whose boss Edward Kassner heard them and agreed to sign them.

Commercial success, 1966–70
The Equals released their first single “I Won’t Be There” in 1966, followed by “Hold Me Closer”, with “Baby, Come Back” as the B-side. It did not do well in the United Kingdom, but after DJs in Europe began playing “Baby, Come Back”, it went to the number one position in Germany and the Netherlands.

1968 saw the release of “I Get So Excited”, which reached the Top 50 of the UK Singles Chart. The subsequent re-issue of “Baby, Come Back” in early 1968 reached the top position in the UK, giving President Records its only number one hit. In June 1969, the group received a gold disc for a combined one million sales of the disc. A string of single releases followed, several of which charted in the UK, including two further top 10 hits, “Viva Bobby Joe” (1969) and “Black Skin Blue Eyed Boys” (1970).

Their songs were mainly written by Eddy Grant, with contributions from the Gordon brothers. Though the majority were on traditional teenage pop themes, some, such as “Stand Up and Be Counted”, “Police on My Back”, and the funky “Black Skin Blue Eyed Boys”, touched on social and political issues.

The band also released several albums on President in quick succession, seven in four years, including Unequalled Equals (1967) and Equals Explosion (1968), both of which reached the UK Albums Chart. Several of their albums were repackaged by RCA, President’s distributors, for the American market. According to the band, Kassner did not allow the band to tour the U.S. because of problems that might have arisen because of their multiracial line-up, though the band did tour other parts of the world, including Africa.

They made regular TV appearances on programmes including Top of the Pops in Britain and Beat-Club in Germany. The band also gained attention for their colourful clothes, presaging the glam rock style, and for Grant’s occasional dyeing of his hair blonde, and wearing a woman’s blonde wig. Writer Jason Heller commented: “The Equals were effectively code-switching between two audiences—immigrant rude boys and white pop fans—in the same song, if not the same line."

Break-up and subsequent activities
In September 1969, all five group members were injured in a motorway car accident in Germany. Grant was the most severely injured and as a result left the touring version of the Equals while initially continuing to write songs for them. In January 1971, Grant suffered a collapsed lung and heart infection, following which he returned to Guyana. He soon started to pursue a solo career. 

In 1982, due to German public demand, concert promoter Rainer Haas contacted Pat Lloyd to get The Equals back touring in Germany. Consequently, later that year, Lloyd reformed The Equals and in 2017 became the registered trademark and copyright owner with Eddy Grant. The Equals then consisted of Lloyd, Derv and Lincoln Gordon, Ronnie Telemacque and Rob Hendry. Lincoln Gordon left the band shortly after its reformation and in the same year David (Dzal) Martin, who had been a temporary member between 1973-1975, re-joined permanently as lead guitarist. In 1996, The Equals released their album Roots,  mainly written by Lloyd with contributions from Martin.

In 2017, Derv Gordon left The Equals and later that year two new members joined, Decosta Boyce (lead vocals), previously of the funk band Heatwave, and Mark Haley (keyboards), previously with The Kinks. In March 2019, Keeling Lee, previously with Groove Armada, replaced Martin after their tour of Vienna.

Between 2020 and 2021, The Equals went into the studios to make a new album and, in May 2022, they released a single "Nobody's Got Time", written by Eddy Grant. Today The Equals continue to record and tour in the UK, Europe, and worldwide, increasingly influenced by funk and reggae. 

Lloyd is the only remaining founder member of The Equals since their formation in 1965.

Influence
The Equals' music has continued to be influential. In 1980, the Clash recorded a cover version of the Equals' song "Police on My Back". In 1981, the band T-Slam translated to Hebrew and covered "I Get So Excited" under the name "Hamenaka Bemalon" (The Hotel Cleaner) on the Israeli edition of their debut album, “Loud Radio;” outside of Israel, the album featured an English-language version of the song. In 2006, Willie Nile released his cover of "Police on My Back" on his Streets of New York. The Equals' song "Green Light" was covered by the Detroit Cobras on their 2007 Tied & True. Pato Banton scored a UK number one with his cover of "Baby Come Back". Chelsea Handler described a meeting with Pat Lloyd in chapter 6 of her book, Are You There, Vodka? It's Me, Chelsea. UK 2 Tone band The Specials covered The Equals' "Black Skin Blue Eyed Boys" on their 2019 album Encore.

Original line-up
 Eddy Grant (born 5 March 1948, Plaisance, Guyana) – lead guitar 
 John Hall (born 25 October 1946, Islington, London) – drums
 Dervan "Derv" Gordon (born 29 January 1946, Jamaica) – vocals
 Patrick "Pat" Lloyd (born 17 March 1949, Holloway, London) – rhythm guitar 
 Lincoln Gordon (born 29 June 1948, Jamaica) – bass, guitar

Discography

Albums

Compilation albums
Baby, Come Back (US compilation, 1968)
Doin' the 45's (1975)
First Among Equals – The Greatest Hits (1996)
Black Skin Blue Eyed Boys – The Anthology (1999)

Singles

See also
List of artists who reached number one on the UK Singles Chart
List of number-one singles from the 1960s (UK)
UK No.1 Hits of 1968
List of 1960s one-hit wonders in the United States
List of performances on Top of the Pops
List of performers on Top of the Pops
Caribbean music in the United Kingdom
IBC Studios
Laurie Records
RCA Records

Notes

References

External links
MENU for Equals official website

Complete list of LPs and singles

Beat groups
British soul musical groups
Musical groups established in 1965
English pop music groups
English rock music groups
Musical groups from London
RCA Records artists
Sibling musical groups